Compagnie Française d'Aviation (CFA) was a French aircraft manufacturer of the 1930s and 1940s. It was established in 1936 as a division of the Salmson engine company to handle the mass production of the Cricri light aircraft.

Manufacturing was interrupted by World War II, but was revived on a small scale thereafter. By 1951, their CFA D.7 Cricri Major design and its derivatives were thoroughly outdated, and the company was dissolved at this time.

References

 
 

Defunct aircraft manufacturers of France
Vehicle manufacturing companies established in 1936
Vehicle manufacturing companies disestablished in 1951
French companies established in 1936
1951 disestablishments in France